Nathalie Simard (born 7 July 1969) is a pop singer from Quebec, Canada, and the younger sister of performer René Simard.

Simard was born in Île d'Orléans, near Quebec City, and was discovered by producer Guy Cloutier. Her first role was in a Laura Secord pudding commercial at age 2. She also appeared on some television shows, the first being Le Village de Nathalie, a children's TV show where she wore a princess dress. She also hosted Les Mini-Stars de Nathalie.

Abuse
Simard revealed she had been sexually abused by Cloutier since 1980. She sued him and his company Productions Guy Cloutier (PGC), for more than $1.2 million, but settled out of court. Cloutier was convicted of criminal charges in 2004 regarding this assault and that of another unidentified child. He subsequently received a 3.5-year prison term.

Michel Vastel's biography on Simard, Briser le Silence (Break the Silence), was published in 2005 amid controversy. Vastel blasted Radio-Canada for continuing to work on television programs with Cloutier through his new company, Novem Communications. The book also charged René Simard with mishandling his sister's finances when he was her legal guardian, and with attempting to bribe her to keep details of Cloutier's abuses from the public. René Simard responded to these claims with a news conference denying details of Vastel's account.

Curtailed comeback
Simard curtailed a tour for the 2007 album Il y avait un jardin, her first album since the 1990s. She announced that she would leave the entertainment industry and move with her daughter to the Dominican Republic to escape scrutiny by the media after performing a final Montreal concert in April 2008. The Nathalie Simard Foundation, which she established in 2005 to assist sexually abused children, was also shut down. Following this cancellation, a $2.3 million lawsuit was filed against Simard and her production company in April 2008 claiming a loss of expected tour profits. Two additional lawsuits were also active as Yves Campeau sought $38,000 while her former manager Éric Dubois sought $60,000. Both Campeau and Dubois were reportedly ex-boyfriends of Simard.

Discography
Le temps des fêtes chez la famille Simard à l'Ile d'Orléans (with other members of the Simard family), 1972
18 ans déjà (René Simard album where she sings on "Tous les enfants du monde" and "Noël des enfants"), 1979
Joyeux Noël...Nathalie, 1979
Nathalie chante pour ses amis, 1980
Nathalie Simard (Je n'aurais jamais dû partir), 1980
Un Noël blanc (with other artists; 2 new songs), 1980
La Rentrée...Nathalie, 1981
Noël avec Nathalie et les Petits Chanteurs de Granby, 1981   See also D'où viens-tu, bergère?
Nathalie Simard (Ouvre-moi la porte), 1982
20 souvenirs de Noël René et Nathalie (compilation), 1982
René et Nathalie Sur la plage (compilation with 2 new songs), 1983
René et Nathalie en concert (1982 concert), 1983
Comment ça va (René Simard album where she sings on "Fais pas la gueule au Bon Dieu"), 1983
Animauville, 1983
Nostalgie de Noël (compilation with other artists), 1983
Chante avec Nathalie (Monsieur Fred Hamster), 1984
Chante et raconte La Guerre des tuques, 1984
Joyeuses Fêtes René & Nathalie (compilation), 1984
 J'ai rencontré le Père Noël, 1984 (Quebec Version)
Nathalie Simard (Mes amis les calinours), 1985
15 Grands Succès de Nathalie (compilation), 1985
Noël sous la neige (compilation, with other artists), 1985
Le Village de Nathalie vol.1: 'la lettre d'amour''', 1986Le Village de Nathalie vol.2 (12 new songs), 1986Le Village de Nathalie vol.3: 'Le Noël de Saute-Flocon', 1986La Fugue du petit poucet (Le lapin qui peint; music for children with other artists) Paris, 1986Noël d'antan (with other artists, compilation with new songs), 1986Nathalie Simard: édition spéciale, promotional cassette for SmartiesJoyeux Noël à tous les enfants (compilation with one new song), 1987René - Nathalie Simard (Tout si tu m'aimes), 1988Au maximum, 1991Parole de femme, 1994Demain matin Montréal m'attend (with other artists), 1995René et Nathalie, collection 25 ans de carrière (compilation), 1996Une femme ...Un enfant; Nathalie (compilation with one new song), 1997Les coups d'coeur de Décibel (theme song of the TV show), 1999Il y avait un jardin, 2007Nathalie et Régis chantent Noël, 2011Je veux vivre, 2019

Television
 Le Village de Nathalie (1985–1988) - TVALes mini-stars de Nathalie (1988–1990) - TVA
 Décibel (1999–2000)
 Le petit monde de Laura Cadieux : Thérèse

FilmographyUn enfant comme les autres - 1972
 J'ai Rencontré Le Père Noël - 1984 (Quebec Version) North Station (Station Nord) - 2002Thieves of innocence, Les voleurs d'enfance - 2005, documentary

References

External links
 
 Canoe profile
Nathalie Simard – The Encyclopedia of Music in Canada''

1969 births
French Quebecers
Living people
Singers from Quebec
People from Capitale-Nationale
French-language singers of Canada
Canadian women pop singers